EuroVelo 1 (EV1), named the Atlantic Coast Route, is a  long EuroVelo long-distance cycling route running from North Cape in Norway to Sagres in Portugal. This north-south route runs (mostly) along the coast of the Atlantic Ocean of Western Europe and passes successively through eight countries: Norway, Scotland, Ireland, Wales, England, France, Spain and Portugal.

Route

In Norway 
North Cape (EV7, EV11), Tromsø, Vestvågøy, Bodø, Trondheim (EV3), Alesund, Bergen (EV12).

Note that since 2008, ferry services no longer operate between Bergen in Norway and the Scottish city of Aberdeen. This can be done by air, however.

In the United Kingdom 
Aberdeen (EV12), Banff, Nairn (EV12), Glasgow, Ayr, Stranraer. Belfast, Craigavon, Derry.

In the Republic of Ireland 
Letterkenny, Galway (Dublin-Galway Greenway EV2), Limerick (Limerick Greenway), Cork, Waterford (Waterford Greenway), Rosslare.

In the United Kingdom 
Fishguard, Swansea, Newport, Bristol, Barnstaple, Plymouth. The EV1 follows the Devon Coast to Coast route (National Route 27) and the Tarka Trail.

In France 
In France, the EV1 is marketed as the Vélodyssée. With a length of  the EV1 connects Roscoff to Hendaye all along the Atlantic Coast. In Brittany, the EV1 largely follows the voie verte (greenway) along the Nantes-Brest canal, while in Aquitaine it follows the greenway along the coast of the Landes forest.

Roscoff (EV4), Nantes (EV6), La Rochelle, Arcachon, Hendaye.

In Spain 
Pamplona (EV3), Burgos (EV3), Salamanca, Merida, Huelva.

In Portugal 
Faro, Sagres, Nazaré, Figueira da Foz, Porto.

Gallery

See also
EuroVelo
Norwegian National Cycle Routes
National Cycle Network

References

External links

Velodyssey, the Atlantic cycling route

EuroVelo
Cycleways in Norway
Cycleways in the United Kingdom
Cycleways in France
Cycleways in Spain
Cycleways in Portugal